Alexander Wilson Rennolds (10 July 1888 – 20 November 1948) was an Australian rules footballer who played for the Melbourne Football Club in the Victorian Football League (VFL).

Notes

External links 

1888 births
Australian rules footballers from Victoria (Australia)
Melbourne Football Club players
Brighton Football Club players
1948 deaths